Caudalia is a monotypic genus of  long-spinneret ground spiders containing the single species, Caudalia insularis. It was first described by G. Alayón G. in 1980, and is only found on the Greater Antilles.

See also
 List of Prodidominae species

References

Monotypic Araneomorphae genera
Spiders of the Caribbean